Serbia has participated in the Turkvision Song Contest four times, 2 times as Kosovo, 1 as Sandžak/Serbia and once as Serbia: in the  contest, held in Istanbul, Turkey. Raška region (Sandžak) and Kosovo participated in this competition for Serbia until 2015, from 2020 Serbia participates only as Serbia. Serbian broadcaster RTV Novi Pazar is responsible for Serbia's participation in the contest.

History
On 20 November 2015 it was confirmed that Serbia would make their official Turkvision Song Contest début at the 2015 contest to be held in Istanbul, Turkey. On 7 December 2015 it was announced that he will represent the Sandžak region of Serbia. Before that, the Serbian province of Kosovo and Metohija participated in 2013 and later when Sandžak in 2015. After the competition was closed in the period from 2016 to 2019, in 2020 Serbia performed only as Serbia for the first time. However, considering that the same broadcaster that chose the entry for Sandžak also chooses the entry for Serbia, it was decided that the song from 2015 will be counted as a Serbian representative.

Participation overview

Related involvement

Jury members

See also 
 Serbia in the Eurovision Song Contest
 Serbia in the Eurovision Young Musicians
 Serbia in the Junior Eurovision Song Contest
 Kosovo in the Turkvision Song Contest
 Kosovo in the Eurovision Young Dancers

References

External links 

"Trag" performed at the 2015 contest

Turkvision
Countries in the Turkvision Song Contest